Torres del Obispo is a hamlet located in the municipality of Graus, in Huesca province, Aragon, Spain. As of 2020, it has a population of 146.

Geography 
Torres del Obispo is located 85km east of Huesca.

References

Populated places in the Province of Huesca